Doğa Rutkay (born 30 October 1978) is a Turkish actress and TV presenter.

She is the daughter of actor Rutkay Aziz. Her parents divorced when she was 5 years old. In 2000, she graduated from Mimar Sinan Fine Arts University State Conservatory with a degree in theatre studies. She started her career as a stage actress with roles in the plays 27 Numara, Terk and Averaj Takımı.

In 1998, she made her debut on television with a role in Çiçeği Büyütmek. In 1999, Rutkay joined the cast of Çağan Irmak's series Günaydın İstanbul Kardeş. In 2001, she acted alongside Emel Sayın and Mehmet Ali Erbil in the series Aşkım Aşkım as Layla. Rutkay then was cast alongside Halil Ergün and Oya Aydoğan in the series Pembe Patikler, portraying the character of Zeliş. Aside from her acting career, she has worked as a TV presenter on different channels. In 2014, she presented Kanal D program Buyur Burdan Bak. She also worked as actor for numerous different roles on Show TV's theatrical comedy Güldür Güldür Show. She presented talk show "Doğa Rutkay ile Herşey Bu Masada". She is presenting kid program "Çocuktan Al Haberi"

Filmography

TV series

Film

TV programs

References

External links 

1978 births
Turkish television actresses
Turkish film actresses
Turkish stage actresses
Living people
Mimar Sinan Fine Arts University alumni
Actresses from Ankara